William County, Virginia is an incorrect term for:
Prince William County, Virginia
King William County, Virginia